Future Diary is a Japanese manga series written and illustrated by Sakae Esuno. The manga was serialized in Kadokawa Shoten's Shōnen Ace magazine from January 26, 2006 to December 25, 2010 and was compiled into 12 volumes published by Kadokawa Shoten, plus two side-story manga, Future Diary: Mosaic and Future Diary: Paradox, compiled in one volume each. The manga was originally licensed in English by Tokyopop for North America, but only ten volumes were released before Tokyopop ceased publishing operations on May 31, 2011. The series is currently licensed by Viz Media, who released first nine volumes digitally.

An additional manga titled  was previewed in the May 2013 issue of Shōnen Ace sold on March 26, 2013, and a single volume of Redial was released in July 2013.


Volume list

Future Diary

Extra volumes

References

Lists of manga volumes and chapters